This article contains a list of current SNCF railway stations in the Occitanie region of France.

Ariège (09)

 Andorre-L'Hospitalet
 Ax-les-Thermes
 Les Cabannes
 Foix
 Luzenac-Garanou
 Mérens-les-Vals
 Pamiers
 Saint-Jean-de-Verges
 Saverdun
 Tarascon-sur-Ariège
 Varilhes
 Le Vernet-d'Ariège

Aude (11)

 Bram
 Carcassonne
 Castelnaudary
 Couffoulens-Leuc
 Coursan
 Leucate-La Franqui
 Lézignan-Corbières
 Limoux
 Limoux-Flassian
 Narbonne
 Pomas
 Port-la-Nouvelle
 Verzeille

Aveyron (12)

 Aubin
 Baraqueville-Carcenac-Peyralès
 Campagnac-Saint-Geniez
 Capdenac
 Cransac
 Luc-Primaube
 Millau
 Montpaon
 Najac
 Naucelle
 Nuces
 Rodez
 Saint-Christophe
 Saint-Georges-de-Luzençon
 Saint-Rome-de-Cernon
 Salles-Courbatiès
 Sévérac-le-Château
 Tournemire-Roquefort
 Villefranche-de-Rouergue
 Viviez-Decazeville

Gard (30)

 Aigues-Mortes
 Aimargues
 Alès
 Beaucaire
 Beauvoisin
 Boucoiran
 Le Cailar
 Chamborigaud
 Fons-Saint-Mamert
 Gallargues
 Générac
 Génolhac
 Grand'Combe-la-Pise
 Le Grau-du-Roi
 La Lavade
 Milhaud
 Nîmes
 Nîmes-Pont-du-Gard
 Nozières-Brignon
 Saint-Césaire
 Sainte-Cécile-d'Andorage
 Saint-Geniès-de-Malgoirès
 Saint-Laurent-d'Aigouze
 Uchaud
 Vauvert
 Vergèze-Codognan

Gers (32)

 Aubiet
 Auch
 Gimont-Cahuzac
 L'Isle-Jourdain

Haute-Garonne (31)

 Auterive
 Avignonet
 Baziège
 Boussens
 Brax-Léguevin
 Carbonne
 Castelnau-d'Estrétefonds
 Cazères
 Cintegabelle
 Colomiers
 Colomiers-Lycée-International
 Escalquens
 Le Fauga
 Gallieni-Cancéropôle
 Gragnague
 Labège-Innopole
 Labège-Village
 Lacourtensourt
 Lardenne
 Longages-Noé
 Martres-Tolosane
 Mérenvielle
 Montastruc-la-Conseillère
 Montaudran
 Montlaur
 Montrabé
 Montréjeau-Gourdan-Polignan
 Muret
 Pibrac
 Pins-Justaret
 Portet-Saint-Simon
 Ramassiers
 Roqueserière-Buzet
 Saint-Gaudens
 Saint-Jory
 Saint-Martin-du-Touch
 Saint-Martory
 Le TOEC
 Toulouse-Matabiau
 Toulouse-Saint-Agne
 Toulouse-Saint-Cyprien-Arènes
 Venerque-le-Vernet
 Villefranche-de-Lauragais
 Villenouvelle

Hautes-Pyrénées (65)

 Capvern
 Lannemezan
 Lourdes
 Ossun
 Saint-Pé-de-Bigorre
 Tarbes
 Tournay

Hérault (34)

 Agde
 Baillargues
 Bédarieux
 Béziers
 Le Bousquet-d'Orb
 Les Cabrils
 Ceilhes-Roqueredonde
 Frontignan
 Lunas
 Lunel
 Lunel-Viel
 Magalas
 Marseillan-Plage
 Montpellier-Saint-Roch
 Montpellier Sud de France
 Saint-Aunès
 Sète
 Valergues-Lansargues
 Vias
 Vic-Mireval
 Villeneuve-lès-Maguelone

Lot (46)

 Assier
 Bagnac
 Bretenoux-sur-Biars
 Cahors
 Dégagnac
 Figeac
 Gignac-Cressensac
 Gourdon
 Gramat
 Lalbenque-Fontanes
 Laval-de-Cère
 Puybrun
 Les Quatre-Routes
 Rocamadour-Padirac
 Saint-Denis-près-Martel
 Souillac

Lozère (48)

 Allenc
 Aumont-Aubrac
 Bagnols-Chadenet
 Balsièges-Bourg
 Banassac-La Canourgue
 Barjac
 La Bastide–Saint-Laurent-les-Bains
 Belvezet
 Le Bruel
 Chanac
 Chapeauroux
 Chasseradès
 Chirac
 Langogne
 Luc
 Marvejols
 Mende
 Le Monastier
 Saint-Chély-d'Apcher
 Les Salelles
 Villefort

Pyrénées-Orientales (66)

 Argelès-sur-Mer
 Banyuls-sur-Mer
 Béna Fanès
 Bolquère-Eyne
 Bourg-Madame
 Cerbère
 Collioure
 Elne
 Err
 Estavar
 Fontpédrouse-Saint-Thomas-les-Bains
 Font-Romeu-Odeillo-Via
 Ille-sur-Têt
 Joncet
 Latour-de-Carol-Enveitg
 Marquixanes
 Millas
 Mont-Louis-La Cabanasse
 Nyer
 Olette-Canaveilles-les-Bains
 Osséja
 Perpignan
 Planès
 Porté-Puymorens
 Port-Vendres-Ville
 Prades-Molitg-les-Bains
 Ria
 Rivesaltes
 Saillagouse
 Sainte-Léocadie
 Saint-Féliu-d'Avall
 Salses
 Sauto
 Serdinya
 Le Soler
 Thuès-Carança
 Thuès-les-Bains
 Ur-Les Escaldes
 Villefranche–Vernet-les-Bains
 Vinça

Tarn (81)

 Albi-Madeleine
 Albi-Ville
 Carmaux
 Castres
 Les Cauquillous
 Cordes-Vindrac
 Damiatte-Saint-Paul
 Gaillac
 Labruguière
 Lavaur
 Lisle-sur-Tarn
 Marssac-sur-Tarn
 Mazamet
 Rabastens-Couffouleux
 Saint-Sulpice
 Tanus
 Tessonnières
 Vielmur-sur-Agout

Tarn-et-Garonne (82)

 Albias
 Castelsarrasin
 Caussade
 Dieupentale
 Grisolles
 Laguépie
 Lamagistère
 Lexos
 Moissac
 Montauban-Ville-Bourbon
 Montbartier
 Valence-d'Agen
 La Ville-Dieu

See also
 SNCF 
 List of SNCF stations for SNCF stations in other regions

Occitanie